Hatch's Minnesota Cavalry Battalion  was a Minnesota USV cavalry battalion that served in the Union Army during the American Civil War and American Indian Wars.

Service 
The unit's formation was a product of the Mdewakanton uprising in August of 1862. Very quickly nearly every band of Chippewa offered to fight the Sioux for the U.S. Governnment. First two Wisconsin chiefs sent a letter to President Lincoln with the offer.  Then on 15 September 22 chiefs did the same at the Crow Wing Indian Agency.  Both of Minnesota's U.S. Senators and Governor Ramsey thought the Chippewa should be taken up on their offers.  A week later 40 odd Chippewa leaders from nearly every band in Minnesota, plus a couple from Wisconsin, arrived in St Paul at Gov. Ramsey's invite.  At that time everyone learned that Major general Pope commander of the Department of the Northwest did not want "Indians" in his command as a matter of "public policy".  Over the winter the politicians decided to go directly to the Secretary of War Stanton.  They proposed a mounted unit of 1000 "auxillary Chippewa warriors", on "Indian ponys", commanded E.A.C. Hatch, that reported directly to the War Department.  It was envisioned as an independent command, functioning "solely" for the prosecution of the Indian War.  Pope had issues with most of the proposal and had enough rank to get it modified.  The result was a mounted unit that reported to his command, solely for the Indian war, with only a few Native Americans in it's ranks.  To get volunteers a $40.00 bounty was advertised in the papers.  The Battalion was Minnesota's last Civil War unit to stand down.  Major Hatch sent letters to the media with the letterhead "Indian Battalion of Minnesota Volunteers". 

Chippewa Chief Hole in the Day offered Brig. General Sibley 600 warriors for his 1863 expedition into the Dakota Territory and was turned down. A month later he made an offer to Major Hatch..  Hatch had to refuse because of Pope.  Hole-in the-day told the newspapers that Hatch was the right man for the command.  In 1865 newspapers reported that Hole-in-the-Day regretted not having been able to raise the Chippewa battalion for Major Hatch.   

Hatch's Battalion was organized at Fort Snelling and St. Paul, Minnesota, with Companies A, B, C, and D being mustered in from July 25, to September, 1863.  General Pope created a line of defense in the war's theater of operations starting at Sioux City, Iowa, through Minnesota to Fort Abercrombie, Dakota Territory and north to the international border.
   In May, 1864 the battalion was posted the northern section of the line with Hq posted to Fort Abercrombie along with Companies A and B assigned to the Fort's garrison, Company C moved to the stockades at Alexandria and Pomme de Terre, while Company D was sent north to Fort Pembina.  The  2nd Minn Cavalry had the line south of them to near the Iowa border.  The battalion was increased in size when Company E was mustered on August 31, 1864, and again when Company F was mustered on September 1, 1864.  In October 1864 Major Hatch received orders from Fort Snelling to retrieve Sioux leaders who had crossed into lands of the British Crown owned by the Hudson Bay Company (HBC).  Companies A, B, C, and D headed to Pembina, Dakota Territory the first week of October in 1863 but winter set in before they reached Pembina.  Hatch made an encampment, sending 20 men across the border to meet a HBC trader named John McKenzie.  The troop encountered and killed Minnesota Sioux at St. Joseph 15km across the border.  At Fort Gerry two Mdewakanton leaders were drugged by McKenzie.  They were bound to dogsleds and taken to Hatch's men at the border for Minnesota's $1000.00 bounty.  The killings at St. Joseph caused almost 400 Sioux to turn themselves in to Hatch as well.  Hatch messaged Gen. Pope for instructions and was told he was not to make treaty with them, their surrender was unconditional.  When conditions allowed, Hatch accompanied the prisoners back to Fort Snelling.  The two chiefs were hung for crimes against unarmed civilians.  They were Little Six (Taoyteduta Shakopee) and Medicine Bottle (Wakanozanzan).  Those Sioux that turned themselves in were sent to Crow Creek Reservation.  Hatch left military service in June.   On 15 July Lt. Col. C. Powell Adams, ex-1st Minnesota's assumed command. He was in the 1st Minnesota's Gettysburg charge.   In 1865 newspapers reported that Hole-in-the-Day regretted not having been able to raise the Chippewa for the battalion for Major Hatch. The Battalion was mustered out between April 26 and June 22, 1866 bringing an end to Minnesota's response to the 1862 Uprising and were Minnesota's last men to put down their swords of war.

Commander
 Major E. A. C. Hatch - September 30, 1863 to June 1864
 Lieutenant Colonel Charles Powell Adams - July 15, 1864 to June 22, 1866

Casualties and total strength
Hatch's Minnesota Cavalry Battalion did not lose any men who were killed or who died of wounds received in battle, but did have 21 enlisted men who died of disease, for a total of 21 fatalities.
Known graves of Hatch's Battlion servicemen

References

External links
 The Civil War Archive Website
 Minnesota Historical Society page on Minnesota and the Civil War

See also
 List of Minnesota Civil War Units

Units and formations of the Union Army from Minnesota
1863 establishments in Minnesota
Military units and formations established in 1863
Military units and formations disestablished in 1866